Fazle Mahmud Rabbi (born 13 December 1987) is a first-class and List A cricketer from Bangladesh who is sometimes referred to on scoresheets by his nickname 'Rabbi'.  He made his first-class debut for Barisal Division in 2003–04 against Dhaka Division.

He was the leading run-scorer for Prime Doleshwar Sporting Club in the 2017–18 Dhaka Premier Division Cricket League, with 708 runs in 16 matches.

In August 2018, he was one of twelve debutants to be selected for a 31-man preliminary squad for Bangladesh ahead of the 2018 Asia Cup. In October 2018, he was named in Bangladesh's One Day International (ODI) for their series against Zimbabwe. He made his ODI debut for Bangladesh against Zimbabwe on 21 October 2018.

In October 2018, he was named in the squad for the Rajshahi Kings team, following the draft for the 2018–19 Bangladesh Premier League. He was the leading run-scorer for Brothers Union in the 2018–19 Dhaka Premier Division Cricket League tournament, with 603 runs in 13 matches. In November 2019, he was selected to play for the Rangpur Rangers in the 2019–20 Bangladesh Premier League.

In December 2021, he was named as the replacement of Shakib Al Hasan to Bangladesh's Test squad for their series against New Zealand.

References

1987 births
Living people
Bangladesh One Day International cricketers
Bangladeshi cricketers
Barisal Division cricketers
Kala Bagan Krira Chakra cricketers
Khelaghar Samaj Kallyan Samity cricketers
Victoria Sporting Club cricketers
Bangladesh South Zone cricketers
Prime Doleshwar Sporting Club cricketers
Rangpur Riders cricketers
Rajshahi Royals cricketers
Brothers Union cricketers
People from Barisal
Rupganj Tigers Cricket Club cricketers